Events from the year 1992 in the United States.

Incumbents

Federal government 
 President: George H. W. Bush (R-Texas)
 Vice President: Dan Quayle (R-Indiana)
 Chief Justice: William Rehnquist (Wisconsin)
 Speaker of the House of Representatives: Tom Foley (D-Washington)
 Senate Majority Leader: George J. Mitchell (D-Maine)
 Congress: 102nd

Events

January
 January 1 – George H. W. Bush becomes the first U.S. President to address the Australian Parliament.
 January 8 – George H. W. Bush is televised falling violently ill at a state dinner in Japan, vomiting into the lap of Prime Minister Kiichi Miyazawa and fainting.
 January 5 – Seventeen-year-old Kelly Dae Wilson disappears in Gilmer, Texas. Her case became one of the biggest unsolved missing-persons cases in Texas.
 January 11 – Twelve-year-old Shanda Sharer is tortured and burned to death by four teenage girls in Madison, Indiana. The crime attracts international attention due to its brutality and the young age of the perpetrators.
 January 26 
Boris Yeltsin announces that Russia will stop targeting United States cities with nuclear weapons.
Super Bowl XXVI: The Washington Redskins defeat the Buffalo Bills 37–24 at the Hubert H. Humphrey Metrodome in Minneapolis, Minnesota.
January 28 – George H. W. Bush delivers his final State of the Union Address.

February
 February 1 – The United States Coast Guard begins deporting the first of some 14,000 refugees from Haiti.
 February 10 
Tom Harkin wins the Iowa Democratic Caucus.
In Indianapolis, Indiana, boxer Mike Tyson is convicted of raping Desiree Washington.
 February 17 – A court in Milwaukee, Wisconsin sentences serial killer Jeffrey Dahmer to life in prison.
 February 18 – In New Hampshire, U.S. President George H. W. Bush defeats Pat Buchanan in the Republican primary; Paul Tsongas leads the Democratic candidates.

March
 March 10 – On 'Super Tuesday', U.S. President George H. W. Bush and Arkansas Governor Bill Clinton win most of the primaries held.
 March 18 – On CNN's Larry King Live, Texas billionaire H. Ross Perot announces that he will run for U.S. president as an independent if volunteers put him on the ballot in all 50 states.
 March 30 – The 64th Academy Awards, hosted by Billy Crystal, are held at Dorothy Chandler Pavilion in Los Angeles, with Jonathan Demme's The Silence of the Lambs winning five awards, including Best Picture and Best Director. Barry Levinson's Bugsy leads the nominations with ten. The telecast garners over 44 million viewers.
 March 31 – , the last active U.S. Navy battleship, is decommissioned at Long Beach, California.

April
 April 2 – In New York, Mafia boss John Gotti is convicted of the murder of mob boss Paul Castellano and racketeering, and is later sentenced to life in prison.
 April 5 – Approximately 500,000 people march on Washington, D.C. in support of abortion rights in advance of oral arguments in the case Planned Parenthood v. Casey.
 April 6
 Microsoft releases Windows 3.1.
 Barney & Friends debuts on PBS.
 April 8 – Former tennis player Arthur Ashe, 48, announces that he is suffering from the AIDS virus, which he is believed to have contracted from a blood transfusion during heart surgery in 1983. He had been diagnosed with HIV more than three years prior.
 April 9 – A Miami, Florida jury convicts former Panamanian ruler Manuel Noriega of assisting Colombia's cocaine cartel.
 April 13 – The Chicago Flood occurs, causing approximately $2 billion in damages to the city (equivalent to $4.12 billion in 2022).
 April 25 – The 7.2  Cape Mendocino earthquake shakes the north coast of California with a maximum Mercalli intensity of IX (Violent), causing $48.3–75 million in losses and 98–356 injuries. This was the first instrumentally recorded event that showed shallow angle thrust movement on the southern Cascadia Subduction Zone. Two triggered strike-slip events caused additional destruction the following day.
 April 29–May 4 – In Simi Valley, California, a jury acquits four LAPD police officers accused of excessive force in the videotaped beating of black motorist Rodney King, causing the 1992 Los Angeles riots and leading to 53 deaths and $1 billion in damage.

May
 May 1 – Eric Houston of Yuba County kills four, injures nine, and holds many others hostage at Lindhurst High School in Olivehurst, California.
 May 5 – Alabama ratifies a 202-year-old proposed amendment to the United States Constitution making the 27th Amendment law. This amendment bars the U.S. Congress from giving itself a midterm or retroactive pay raise.
 May 16 – STS-49: Space Shuttle Endeavour lands safely after a successful maiden voyage.
 May 18 – The Twenty-seventh Amendment to the United States Constitution is enacted.
 May 19 
In San Francisco, U.S. Vice President Dan Quayle gives his famous Murphy Brown speech.
In Massapequa, New York, Amy Fisher shoots Mary Jo Buttafuoco, wife of Joey Buttafuoco.
 May 22 – After 30 years, Johnny Carson retires as host of NBC's The Tonight Show.
 May 25 – Jay Leno becomes the new host of NBC's The Tonight Show, following the retirement of Johnny Carson.

June

 June – As a result of the early 1990s recession and subsequent sluggish job creation, unemployment peaks at 7.8%, a level not seen since March 1984. This would contribute to President George H. W. Bush's defeat to Bill Clinton in the election later that year. 
 June 1 – Kentucky celebrates its bicentennial statehood.
 June 15
Delta Phi Beta, a South Asian fraternity is founded at the University of California, Berkeley.
During a spelling bee at a Trenton, New Jersey elementary school, U.S. Vice President Dan Quayle erroneously corrects a student's spelling of the word potato, indicating it should have an e at the end.
 June 16 – A federal grand jury indicts Caspar Weinberger for his role in covering up the Iran–Contra affair.  
 June 17 – A 'Joint Understanding' agreement on arms reduction is signed by U.S. President George H. W. Bush and Russian President Boris Yeltsin (this is later codified in START II).
 June 23 – Mafia boss John Gotti is sentenced to life in prison, after being found guilty of conspiracy to commit murder and racketeering on April 2.
 June 24 
The Franco-American Flag is officially raised for the first time in Manchester, New Hampshire. The flag was presented by singer Édith Butler as part of a tour.
The Supreme Court rules 5–4 in Planned Parenthood v. Casey, the first landmark abortion case since Roe v. Wade. In Casey the Court decided to uphold the "essential holding" of Roe that a woman has the right to an abortion but introduced a new "undue burden" standard which allows states to impose certain regulation so long as those regulations did not create a "substantial obstacle in the path of a woman seeking an abortion before the fetus attains viability."
 June 28 
The 7.3  Landers earthquake shakes the Mojave Desert region of Southern California with a maximum Mercalli intensity of IX (Violent), causing $92 million in losses, three deaths and 400+ injuries.
The 6.5  Big Bear earthquake shakes the San Bernardino Mountains region of Southern California about three hours later. This triggered event had a maximum Mercalli intensity of VIII (Severe), causing moderate damage and some injuries.

July
 July – The Goosebumps series of children's horror fiction, penned by R. L. Stine, is first published.
 July 9 – Bill Clinton announces his selection of Al Gore as his running mate in the 1992 U.S. presidential election.
 July 10 – In Miami, Florida, former Panamanian leader Manuel Noriega is sentenced to 40 years in prison for drug and racketeering violations.
 July 16 – Arkansas Governor Bill Clinton is nominated for U.S. president and Tennessee Senator Al Gore for vice president at the Democratic National Convention in New York City.

August

 August 11 – The largest shopping mall in the U.S., Minnesota's Mall of America, constructed on 78 acres (316,000 m2), opens in Bloomington.
 August 20 – The Republican National Convention in Houston, Texas re-nominates U.S. President George H. W. Bush and Vice President Dan Quayle. Pat Buchanan, one of Bush's opponents in the primaries, delivers a controversial convention speech, in which he refers to a "religious war" in the country.
 August 21–22 – Events at Ruby Ridge, Idaho are sparked by a federal U.S. Marshal surveillance team, resulting in the death of a Marshal, Sam Weaver, and his dog, and the next day the wounding of Randy Weaver, the death of his wife Vicki, and the wounding of Kevin Harris.
 August 24–28 – Hurricane Andrew hits south Florida and dissipates over the Tennessee valley, killing 65 and causing US$26.5 billion in damage.

September
 September 5 – Batman: The Animated Series premieres on Fox Kids.
 September 11 – Hurricane Iniki hits the Hawaiian Islands, Kauai and Oahu.
 September 12 – STS-47: Dr. Mae Jemison becomes the first African American woman to travel into space, aboard the Space Shuttle Endeavour.
 September 23 – Operation Julin is the last nuclear test conducted by the United States at the Nevada Test Site.
 September 24
 The Kentucky Supreme Court, in Kentucky v. Wasson, holds that laws criminalizing same-sex sodomy are unconstitutional, and accurately predicts that other states and the nation will eventually rule the same way.
 The Sci-Fi Channel launches with a broadcast of Star Wars.

October
 October 1 – The Turner Broadcasting System's Cartoon Network goes on the air. The Merrie Melodies short, Rhapsody Rabbit, is the very first cartoon to be broadcast on the network.
 October 2 – Pittsburgh International Airport's new facility opens in Findlay Township, near Pittsburgh, Pennsylvania. The new terminal is built as an expansion for USAir and an upgrade from the older Pittsburgh International Airport facility.
 October 3 – After performing a song protesting alleged child abuse by the Catholic Church, Sinéad O'Connor rips up a photo of Pope John Paul II on Saturday Night Live, causing huge controversy, leading the switchboards at NBC to ring off the hook.
 October 8 – The video game Mortal Kombat is released.
 October 9 
The Chief of Naval Operations adopts the US Navy's core values: Honor, Courage and Commitment.
A 13-kilogram (29-pound) meteorite lands in the driveway of the Knapp residence in Peekskill, New York, destroying the family's Chevrolet Malibu. It becomes known as the Peekskill Meteorite.
October 11 – Ross Perot, Bill Clinton, and George H. W. Bush participate in the first debate of the 1992 election at Washington University in St. Louis.
October 13 – Al Gore, James Stockdale, and Dan Quayle participate in the 1992 vice presidential debate.
October 14 – A Bunch of Munsch episode "The Paper Bag Princess" is first broadcast on Showtime.
October 15 – Carole Simpson hosts the second debate of the presidential election at the University of Richmond.
 October 17 – Yoshihiro Hattori, a 16-year-old Japanese exchange student, mistakes the address of a party and is shot dead after knocking on the wrong door in Baton Rouge, Louisiana. The shooter, Rodney Peairs, is later acquitted, sparking outrage in Japan.
 October 19 – Jim Lehrer hosts the final debate of the presidential election at Michigan State University.
 October 26 – Dry Tortugas National Park is established.
 October 29 – The Food and Drug Administration approves Depo-Provera for use as a contraceptive in the United States.
 October 31 – The pilot episode for X-Men airs on Fox Kids.

November

November 3 – 
Governor Bill Clinton of Arkansas defeats incumbent President George H. W. Bush and businessman H. Ross Perot in the US presidential election.
The heavy metal and Rap rock band Rage Against the Machine releases their debut album.
November 20 – Home Alone 2: Lost in New York is released to theaters.
November 24 – Sonic The Hedgehog 2 is released in the U.S.
November 25 
The Bodyguard, starring Kevin Costner and Whitney Houston, debuts in cinemas; it goes on to become the second highest-grossing film of the year with nearly $122 million in revenue in the U.S. and exceeding $410 million worldwide.
Walt Disney Pictures' 31st feature film, Aladdin, is released to critical and commercial success. It goes on to become the highest-grossing film of the year and (at the time) the highest-grossing animated film of all time, earning over $504 million worldwide – the first animated film to cross the half-billion-dollar mark. It is also the last entirely fairytale-based adaptation released by Disney until 2010's Tangled.

December

 December 3 – UN Security Council Resolution 794 is unanimously passed, approving a coalition of United Nations peacekeepers led by the United States to form UNITAF, tasked with ensuring humanitarian aid gets distributed and establishing peace in Somalia.
 December 4 – U.S. military forces land in Somalia.
 December 5 – Kent Conrad of North Dakota resigns his seat in the United States Senate and is sworn into the other seat from North Dakota, becoming the only U.S. Senator ever to have held two seats on the same day.
 December 8 – Lawrence Eagleburger is sworn in as the new Secretary of State, succeeding James Baker.
 December 15 – Hip hop producer and rapper Dr. Dre releases his solo debut studio album The Chronic, which sparks the beginning of the mainstream popularity and success of Gangsta Rap, G-Funk and West Coast Hip-Hop in the United States (a run that lasts from the early-to-mid-1990s).
 December 23 – The Pittsburgh Steelers win their first ever post-season NFL game, defeating the Oakland Raiders 13–7, on a last second play that becomes known as The Immaculate Reception.
 December 24 – President of the United States George H. W. Bush pardons six national security officials implicated in the Iran–Contra affair of the 1980s, including Caspar Weinberger.
 December 28 – First of four child deaths resulting from the Jack in the Box E. coli outbreak.

Date unknown
Community First Fund is founded in Pennsylvania.
In terms of units sold, compact discs outsell audiocassettes for the first time in the United States.
Y'all theater act is founded in New York.

Ongoing
 Iraqi no-fly zones (1991–2003)

Births

January

 January 1
 Kaitlin Antonneau, racing cyclist
 Jeff Godfrey, American football quarterback
 Jamie Lauren Keiles, writer
 January 3 – Rob Crisp, American football player
 January 6 – Diona Reasonover, actress
 January 8 – Rachell Hofstetter, livestreamer
 January 9
 Jack Campbell, American hockey player
 Terrence Jones, American basketball player
 January 12 – Javier Alvial, footballer
 January 13 – Austin Watson, American hockey player
 January 16
 Alexe Gilles, figure skater
 Piper Gilles, ice dancer
 January 18 – Dagny Knutson, swimmer
 January 19
 Shawn Johnson, artistic gymnast
 Logan Lerman, actor
 Mac Miller, American rapper
 January 21
 Seantrel Henderson, American football player
 Logan O'Brien, actor and singer
 January 25 – Olivia Bonilla, singer-songwriter and musician
 January 26
 Cassidy Lehrman, actress
 Sasha Banks, pro wrestler
 January 27 – Tony Jefferson, American football player
 January 28 
Grace Dunham, writer and activist
Hunter Renfroe, baseball player 
 January 29 
David Fluellen, American football player
George Pocheptsov, painter, draughtsman, and entrepreneur

February

 February 1 – Kelli Goss, actress
 February 2 – Alex Kennedy, race car driver
 February 4 – Hannah Stocking, internet personality
 February 6 – Cara McCollum, journalist (d. 2016)
 February 8 – Karle Warren, actress
 February 10 
 Karen Fukuhara, actress
 Jordan Maron, YouTuber
 February 11 – Taylor Lautner, actor
 February 13 – Keith Appling, college basketball player
 February 14 – Jeff Luc, American football player
 February 15 – Greer Grammer, actress
 February 16 – Steffani Brass, actress
 February 17
 Laivan Greene, actress, singer, and dancer
 Meaghan Jette Martin, actress and singer
 February 18 
 Le'Veon Bell, American football player
 Logan Miller, actor and musician
 February 19 – Paulina Gaitán, Mexican actress
 February 20 – Jarred Tinordi, hockey player
 February 24 – Peter Frenette, ski jumper
 February 25 – Max Aaron, figure skater
 February 26 – Alexandria Mills, beauty pageant winner
 February 27 
 Ty Dillon, race car driver
 Filip Krajinović, American Serbian-born tennis player
 Meyers Leonard, basketball player

 February 29
 Perry Kitchen, soccer player
 Jessica Long, American Russian-born swimmer
 Caitlin EJ Meyer, actress
 Majesty Rose, singer
 Jessie Usher, actor

March

 March 2 – Charlie Coyle, American hockey player
 March 3 – Madison Cross, singer and actress
 March 4
 Derek Forbort, American hockey player
 Jazmin Grace Grimaldi, daughter of Albert II, Prince of Monaco 
 Jared Sullinger, basketball player
 March 5 – Kit Armstrong, pianist and composer
 March 9 – Luis Armand Garcia, actor
 March 10 – Emily Osment, actress and singer
 March 13 – Jelani Jenkins, American football player
 March 14 – Jasmine Murray, singer
 March 15
 Sosie Bacon, actress
 Mary Lou, actress
 March 16 – Tim Hardaway Jr., American basketball player
 March 18 – Anthony Barr, American football player
 March 21 – Joshua Mance, track and field athlete
 March 22 – Jessie Andrews, actress
 March 23 – Kyrie Irving, basketball player
 March 24
Faye Gulini, snowboarder
MyCole Pruitt, American football player
Jeremy Rosado, singer
 March 25 – Elizabeth Lail, actress
 March 26
 Mackenzie Caquatto, artistic gymnast
 Corrie Lothrop, artistic gymnast
 Haley Ramm, actress
 March 27
 Kevin Kowalski, skateboarder
 Ryan Cochran-Siegle, alpine ski racer
 March 29 – Chris Massoglia, actor
 March 30 – MacKinzie Kline, golfer

April

 April 3 – Young M.A., rapper
 April 4 – Alexa Nikolas, actress
 April 6 – Beatrice Capra, tennis player
 April 7
 Kaitlan Collins, journalist
 Alexis Jordan, singer and actress
 April 8
 Matthew Freeman, twirler
 Shelby Young, actress
 April 9 – Joshua Ledet, singer
 April 11 – J.D. Lifshitz, director, producer, screenwriter, and actor
 April 13 – Paul Richardson, American football player
 April 17 – Manuel Ávila, boxer
 April 18 – Chloe Bennet, actress and singer
 April 22 – Joc Pederson, baseball player
 April 23 – Syd tha Kyd, singer, producer and DJ
 April 24 
 Joe Keery, actor and musician
 Doc Shaw, actor and rapper
 April 26
 Jon Cozart, youtuber 
 Aaron Judge, baseball player 
 April 27
 Keenan Allen, football player
 Allison Iraheta, singer
 April 28 – Boxxy, internet celebrity
 April 30 – Kenneth Agostino, ice hockey player

May

 May – Caitlin Brunell, beauty pageant winner 
 May 4
 Miles Robbins, actor and musician
 Phyllis Francis, track and field athlete
 Courtney Jines, actress, producer, and screenwriter
 Victor Oladipo, basketball player
 Grace Phipps, actress, singer, and dancer
 Ashley Rickards, actress
 Shoni Schimmel, Native American basketball player
 May 5 – Jarvis Johnson, YouTuber
 May 7 – Ryan Harrison, tennis player
 May 8 
 Olivia Culpo, beauty pageant
 Kevin Hayes, hockey player
 May 9 – Chris Gutierrez, actor
 May 10 – Jake Zyrus, internationally known Filipino singer
 May 11 – Christina McHale, tennis player
 May 12 – Malcolm David Kelley, actor
 May 13 – Tyrann Mathieu, American football player
 May 15
 Clark Beckham, singer
 José Benavidez, boxer
 Grace Kelly, musician, vocalist, songwriter, arranger, and bandleader
 May 16
 Nicole Boerner, American model
 Kirstin Maldonado, singer
 May 17 – Eric Jagielo, baseball player
 May 18 – Spencer Breslin, actor and musician  
 May 20 – Mattie Larson, gymnast
 May 21 
 Hutch Dano, actor
 Olivia Olson, actress and singer
 May 22 – Anna Baryshnikov, actress
 May 24 – Travis T. Flory, actor
 May 25 – Matt Stonie, competitive eater
 May 26 – Johanna Long, race car driver
 May 29
 Melsahn Basabe, basketball player
 Erica Lindbeck, actress
 May 30
 Harrison Barnes, basketball player
 Jeremy Lamb, American basketball player

June

 June 1 – Prezel Hardy, track and field athlete
 June 6 – DeAndre Hopkins, American football player
 June 7 
 Sara Lee, wrestler and television personality (d. 2022)
 Sara Niemietz, singer-songwriter and actress
 June 9 – Kate Hansen, luger
 June 10 – Kate Upton, actress and model
 June 12
 Allie DiMeco, actress and musician
 Ryan Malgarini, actor
 June 13 – Jason Dardo, American drag queen, burlesque dancer, recording artist, television personality, and model
 June 14 
Joel Crouse, singer-songwriter
Daryl Sabara, actor
 June 15 – Kristie Ahn, tennis player
 June 16 – Emerson Etem, American hockey player
 June 19 – C. J. Mosley, American football linebacker
 June 20 
 Robin Carpenter, cyclist
 Sage the Gemini, rapper, songwriter and producer
 June 21 – Max Schneider, singer-songwriter and actor
 June 22 – Darius Jennings, American football player
 June 23 
 Kate Melton, actress
 Bridget Sloan, artistic gymnast
 June 24 – Raven Goodwin, actress
 June 26 
 Jace Amaro, footballer
 Melanie Amaro, singer
 Jennette McCurdy, actress
 Austin Voth, baseball player
 June 27 – Jordan Hicks, American football player
 June 29 
 Adam G. Sevani, actor and dancer
 June 30 
 Holliston Coleman, actress
 Lynx and Lamb Gaede, twin Neo-Nazi musicians

July

 July 1
 Andrew and Steven Cavarno, twin actors
 Bryan de la Fuente, soccer player
 July 2 – Madison Chock, ice dancer
 July 3 – Santiago Segura, actor
 July 5 – Max Frost, singer-songwriter
 July 6 – Manny Machado, baseball player
 July 8
 Sky Ferreira, singer, songwriter, model, and actress
 Xander Mobus, voice actor
 July 9 – Andrew Everett, professional wrestler
 July 10 – Kristin Allen, gymnast
 July 13 
 Dylan Patton, actor
 Rich the Kid, rapper
 July 17
 Nick Bjugstad, hockey player
 Billie Lourd, actress
 July 18 – Timothy Dolensky, figure skater
 July 20 – Paige Hurd, actress
 July 21 – Rachael Flatt, figure skater
 July 22 – Selena Gomez, singer and actress
 July 24 – Mitch Grassi, member of Pentatonix
 July 25
 Jillian Clare, actress and singer
 Lil Phat, rapper (d. 2012)
 July 28 – Stephone Anthony, footballer 
 July 29 – David Ash, footballer quarterback
 July 30 – Fabiano Caruana, chess player
 July 31
 José Fernández, Cuban-born baseball pitcher (died 2016)
 Kyle Larson, racing driver

August

 August 2
 Hallie Kate Eisenberg, actress
 Malcolm Taylor Jones, American football player
 August 3 – Karlie Kloss, model and ballet dancer
 August 4
 Dylan and Cole Sprouse, twin actors
 Tiffany Evans, singer and actress
 August 5 – Jack McInerney, American soccer player
 August 7 – Bobby Lynn Bryant, boxer
 August 8 – Casey Cott, actor
 August 10 
 Rifqa Bary, Methodist
 August 11 
 Stefan Jerome, soccer player
 Tomi Lahren, television host
 August 13 – Katharine Close, notable academic
 August 16 – Ventura Alvarado, soccer player
 August 18
 Elizabeth Beisel, swimmer
 Frances Bean Cobain, daughter of Kurt Cobain and Courtney Love
 August 20 –
 Demi Lovato, singer and actress
 Alex Newell, actor and singer
 August 21 
 Oliver Bradwell, track and field athlete
 RJ Mitte, actor
 August 22
 Austin Evans, youtuber
 Ari Stidham, actor and musician
 August 24
 Spike Albrecht, basketball player
 Johnny Rapid, gay pornographic film actor
 August 26 
 Jesse Delgado, wrestler
 Hayley Hasselhoff, actress
 August 27 
 Sarah Attar, athlete
 Blake Jenner, actor and singer
 August 28 – Isabelle Abiera, actress and model

September

 September 2 – Madilyn Bailey, singer
 September 3 – August Alsina Hip-hop/R&B Artist
 September 5 – Brandon Allen, footballer quarterback 
 September 10 – Haley Ishimatsu, diver
 September 11 
 Desireé Bassett, guitarist
 MacKenzie Bourg, singer
 JC Caylen, YouTube personality
 September 12 – Connor Franta, YouTuber and entrepreneur
 September 16 – Nick Jonas, singer, songwriter, musician, and actor
 September 18 – Amber Liu, singer
 September 19 
 Gavin Fink, actor
 Erin Jackson, skater
 Palmer Luckey, entrepreneur 
 September 24 
 Ray Drew, football player
 Jack Sock, tennis player
 September 25 – Keauna McLaughlin, skater
 September 27
 Jake Burbage, actor
 Sam Lerner, actor
 September 28
Skye McCole Bartusiak, actress (d. 2014)
Tyler Lockett, American football player
 September 30
 Ezra Miller, actor and singer
 Trevor Barron, race walker
 Bria Hartley, American basketball player

October

 October 1 – Drew Chadwick, musician (Emblem 3)
 October 2 – Kiehl Frazier, football player
 October 6
Rhyon Nicole Brown, actress, singer, and dancer
Shelby Rogers, tennis player
 October 9 – Tyler James Williams, actor
 October 12
 Josh Hutcherson, actor
 October 13
 Aaron Dismuke, actor
 Baby K, notable congenital deformity victim (d. 1995)
 John John Florence, surfer
 October 14 – Savannah Outen, singer
 October 15 – Vincent Martella, actor and singer
 October 16 – Bryce Harper, baseball player
 October 17 – Jacob Artist, actor, dancer and singer 
 October 18 – John John Florence, surfer
 October 20 – Kristian Ipsen, diver
 October 22
 21 Savage, rapper
 Sofia Vassilieva, actress
 October 27 
 Emily Hagins, producer, writer, editor, and director
 Brandon Saad, ice hockey player
 October 28 
 Lexi Ainsworth, actress
 Jermaine Crawford, actor
 October 30 – Tequan Richmond, actor, model, and rapper
 October 31 – Vanessa Marano, actress

November

 November 2 – Chelsea Davis, gymnast
 November 5 – Odell Beckham Jr., American football player
 November 6 – Megan Meier, suicide victim (d. 2006)
 November 9 – CoryxKenshin, youtuber
 November 10 – Teddy Bridgewater, American football player
 November 11 – Cassandra Bankson, model
 November 12
 Macey Cruthird, actress
 Shelbie Bruce, actress
 November 15 – Trevor Story, baseball player
 November 16 – Joe Thuney, American football player
 November 18 – Nathan Kress, actor
 November 19 – Brandon Frazier, pair skater
 November 21 – Megan and Liz Mace, fraternal twin recording artists
 November 23 – Miley Cyrus, singer and actress
 November 25 – Zack Shada, actor
 November 28 
Adam Hicks, actor
Jarvis Landry, American football player
Jake Miller, American rapper and songwriter 
 November 29 – David Lambert, actor

December

 December 1 – Javier Báez, baseball player
 December 6 – TooSmooth, singer, songwriter, musician, record producer, and entrepreneur
 December 8 – Katie Stevens, singer
 December 7 – Sean Couturier, hockey player
 December 11 
 Tiffany Alvord, singer and songwriter
 Ivana Hong, gymnast
 December 12
 Shy Glizzy, rapper
 Austin Jones, singer
 December 17 – Jordan Garrett, actor
 December 18 – Bridgit Mendler, actress, singer, and musician
 December 21
Ha Ha Clinton-Dix, American football player
Haylee Wanstall, Canadian-born actress
 December 22 – Isabella Cruise, daughter of Nicole Kidman and Tom Cruise
 December 23 – Spencer Daniels, actor

Full date unknown
 Victoria Acosta, singer
 Ahney Her, actress
 Daniella Karagach, dancer
 Savannah Smith,  American All State basketball player

Deaths

 January 23 – Ian Wolfe, actor (b. 1896)
 January 27 – Allan Jones, actor and singer (b. 1907)
 January 29 – Willie Dixon, blues musician (b. 1915)
 February 3 – Junior Cook, musician (b. 1934)
 February 7 – Buzz Sawyer, wrestler and trainer (b. 1959)
 February 8 – Bazoline Estelle Usher, African American educator (b. 1885)
 February 9 – Jack Kinney, animator (b. 1909)
 February 13 – Dorothy Tree, actress (b. 1906)
 February 27 – S. I. Hayakawa, Canadian-born academic and Senator for California (b. 1906)
 March 4 – Art Babbitt, animator (b. 1907)
 March 8 – Champ Butler, singer (b. 1926)
 March 26 – Barbara Frum, American-born Canadian radio and television journalist (b. 1937)
 April 4 – Arthur Russell, cellist and composer (b. 1951)
 April 5
 Molly Picon, Yiddish-language actress (b. 1898)
 Sam Walton, businessman, founder of Wal-Mart (b. 1918)
 April 6 – Isaac Asimov, Russian-born science-fiction author (b. 1920)
 April 10 – Sam Kinison, comedian (b. 1953)
 April 14
 David Miller, film director (b. 1909)
 Sammy Price, pianist and bandleader (b. 1908)
 May 6 – Marlene Dietrich, German-born actress and singer (b. 1901 in Germany)
 May 13 – Dawon Kahng, Korean-born electrical engineer (b. 1931)
 May 30 – Antoni Zygmund, Polish-born mathematician (b. 1900)
 June 2 – Philip Dunne, screenwriter and director (b. 1908)
 June 3 – Patrick Peyton, priest (b. 1909)
 June 6 – Larry Riley, actor (b. 1953)
 June 22 – M. F. K. Fisher, food writer b. 1908)
 July 13 – Alex Wojciechowicz, American football player (b. 1915)
 July 27 – Anthony Salerno, mobster (b. 1911)
 August – Chris McCandless, hiker (b. 1968)
 September 1 – Morris Carnovsky, actor (b. 1897)
 September 12 – Ruth Nelson, actress (b. 1905)
 September 21 – Bill Williams, actor (b. 1915)
 September 29 – Paul Jabara, actor and singer-songwriter (b. 1948) 
 October 25 – Roger Miller, singer-songwriter, musician and actor (b. 1936) 
 November 2 – Hal Roach, film and television producer, director and actor (b. 1892)
 November 8
 Larry Levan, DJ (b. 1954)
 Ian Stuart Spiro, commodities broker (b. 1946)
 November 19 – Diane Varsi, actress (b. 1938)
 November 30 – Peter Blume, American painter and sculptor (b. 1906)
 December 8 – William Shawn, editor of The New Yorker (b. 1907)
 December 17 – Dana Andrews, actor (b. 1909)
 December 18 – Mark Goodson, television producer (b. 1915)
 December 21 – Stella Adler, actress and teacher (b. 1901)
 December 27 – Stephen Albert, composer (b. 1941)
 December 28 – Sal Maglie, baseball player (b. 1917)
 December 30 – Timothy S. Healy, Jesuit priest and academic administrator (b. 1923)

See also 
 1992 in American television
 List of American films of 1992
 Timeline of United States history (1990–2009)

References

External links
 

 
1990s in the United States
United States
United States
Years of the 20th century in the United States